The teams of the preliminary stage were announced two days before the kick off, so on July 12.
The caps and goals are as of 1 August 2018, after the preliminary stage and before the main tournament.

Preliminary stage

American Samoa
Coach:  Rupeni Luvu

Cook Islands
Coach:  Anthony Samuela

Samoa
Coach:  Martin Tamasese

Tonga
Coach:  Lafaele Moala

Group A

New Zealand
Coach: Jose Figuiera

Papua New Guinea
Coach: Anthony Pakakota

Solomon Islands
Coach:  Stanley Waita

Vanuatu
Coach:  Joel Rarua

Group B

Fiji
Coach:  Yogendra Dutt

New Caledonia
Coach:  Léon Watrone

Samoa
Coach:  Martin Tamasese

Tahiti
Coach:  Hermann Aurentz

OFC U-17 Championship